This article describes all the 2018 seasons of Formula Renault series across the world.

Formula Renault 2.0L

2018 Formula Renault Eurocup season

2018 Formula Renault Northern European Cup season

2018 Asian Formula Renault Series season

Unofficial Formula Renault championships

2018 Formula STCC Nordic season

2018 V de V Challenge Monoplace

2018 Remus Formula Renault 2.0 Pokal season

The season was held between 13 April and 9 September and raced across Austria, Italy, Czech Republic and Germany. The races occur with other categories cars as part of the 2018 Austria Formula 3 Cup, this section presents only the Austrian Formula Renault 2.0L classification.

Footnotes

2018 Formula Renault 2.0 Argentina season
All cars use Tito 02 chassis, all races were held in Argentina.

1 extra point in each race for regularly qualified drivers.

FIA Formula 4 powered by Renault

2018 French F4 Championship season

2018 F4 Danish Championship

2018 Formula 4 South East Asia Championship

References 

Renault
Formula Renault seasons